"" is the national anthem of Nauru. The lyrics were written by Margaret Hendrie, with music composed by Laurence Henry Hicks. It was adopted in 1968, upon attaining independence from the mostly Australian-administered UN Trusteeship.

History 
The anthem was composed by Anglo-Australian composer and military bandmaster Laurence Henry Hicks, who was leader of the Black Watch Band. It was adopted upon independence from the UN Trust Territory of Nauru, which was mostly administered by Australia, in January 1968. The anthem did not have official lyrics at the time, but lyrics by Nauruan composer Margaret Griffith Hendrie (1935–1990) were later adopted.

Lyrics

See also
 Flag of Nauru

Notes

References

External links
Midi version of the Nauru national anthem
Streaming audio, lyrics and information for the Nauru national anthem (archive link)
Sheet music

Nauru
National symbols of Nauru
Nauruan music
1968 songs
National anthems
1968 establishments in Nauru
National anthem compositions in F major